Student Society Liivika is an Estonian student society. Established on April 21, 1909 in Riga, Latvia, mostly by former members of student corporation Vironia. The original name was Estonian Students' Society of Riga, but was changed when it moved to Tartu after World War I. The society's motto is "Ex solo ad solem soli patriae", which means "Up from the Soil to the Sun for the benefit of Homeland".

Some notable members
Artur Amon
Johannes Hint
Paul Keres
Juhan Kukk
Kaarel Liidak
Mihkel Mathiesen
Georg Meri
Anton Uesson
Valev Uibopuu
Trivimi Velliste

References

External links
 

1900s establishments in Latvia
Organizations established in 1909
1909 establishments in the Russian Empire